Triplax wehrlei is a species of pleasing fungus beetle in the family Erotylidae. It is found in Central America and North America.

References

Further reading

 

Erotylidae
Articles created by Qbugbot
Beetles described in 1954
Beetles of North America
Beetles of Central America